Lucas Maurice Corvée (born 9 June 1993) is a French badminton player affiliated with Issy Les Moulineaux 92 club. Corvée started playing badminton at aged 6 in Alençon badminton club. His mother also a professional badminton player. He became a member of the France national badminton team in 2010, then in 2011, he won a bronze medal at the European Junior Championships in boys' doubles event. Corvée was the champion of the 2013 Puerto Rico International tournament in the men's doubles event partnered with Brice Leverdez.

Corvée competed at the 2015 European Games in Baku, Azerbaijan. He was the men's singles silver medalist at the 2018 Mediterranean Games in Tarragona, Spain.

Achievements

Mediterranean Games 
Men's singles

European Junior Championships 
Boys' doubles

BWF Grand Prix (1 runner-up) 
The BWF Grand Prix had two levels, the Grand Prix and Grand Prix Gold. It was a series of badminton tournaments sanctioned by the Badminton World Federation (BWF) and played between 2007 and 2017.

Men's singles

  BWF Grand Prix Gold tournament
  BWF Grand Prix tournament

BWF International Challenge/Series (4 titles, 16 runners-up) 
Men's singles

Men's doubles

Mixed doubles

  BWF International Challenge tournament
  BWF International Series tournament
  BWF Future Series tournament

References

External links 
 
 
 Centerblog.net Lucas Corvee

1993 births
Living people
Sportspeople from Alençon
French male badminton players
Badminton players at the 2015 European Games
European Games competitors for France
Competitors at the 2018 Mediterranean Games
Mediterranean Games silver medalists for France
Mediterranean Games medalists in badminton